Noakhali Medical Assistant Training School provides 3 years course and 1-year internship Medical Assistant Training courses under Directorate General of Health Services (DGHS). Noakhali MATS is one of eight MATS along with Bagerhat, Kushtia, Sirajganj, Tangail, Comilla, Faridpur and Jhenaidah.

References

External links
 Facebook page

 

Medical education in Bangladesh
Education in Chittagong Division